Nazarat Taleem (Directorate of Education), launched in 1919,  is a directorate within the Sadr Anjuman Ahmadiyya, in Pakistan, responsible for the task of formalizing education within schools and colleges of the Ahmadiyya Muslim Community Pakistan.

History 
Ahmadiyya Muslim Community has been involved in building educational institutes since 1905. Nazarat Taleem (Directorate of Education) one of the ten directorates of  Sadr Anjuman Ahmadiyya was created in 1919.The directorate in Qadian, India, ran various educational institutions. After partition of the subcontinent the offices were shifted to Pakistan.

In 1973, under the label of nationalization, the educational institutes of  Ahmadiyya Muslim Community were nationalized by the Government of Pakistan. These included 8 schools across Pakistan, including 2 top colleges of Pakistan, Taleem-ul-Islam College, in Rabwah. The Government also nationalized 5 of its institutes in the province of Sindh.

In 1987 the Ahmadiyya Muslim Community started building its new educational institutions. Currently Nazarat Taleem is running 11 schools and 2 colleges in Rabwah and 21 schools in remote areas of Pakistan, mostly in the provinces of Sindh and Punjab.

Institutions 
Institutions operating under Nazarat Taleem in .. are as follows:

 Buyut-ul-Hamd Primary School
 Boyut-ul-Hamd High School
 Maryam Girls High School
 Maryam Siddiqa Girls High School
 Nusrat Jahan Academy Boys
 Nusrat Jahan Academy Girls
 Tahir Primary School
 Nasir Higher Secondary School
 Institute for Special Education

Nusrat Jahan College, Rabwah 

Nazarat Taleem offers undergraduate and postgraduate education to the community members through, Nusrat Jahan College, Rabwah. Currently BS Honors and master's degree programs in pure and applied scientific fields are being offered there.

The three schools run by the college are:
Abdus Salam School of Sciences.
MM Ahmed School of Business
Sir Zafarullah Khan school of social sciences and languages.

The majority of the students enrolled in these schools are Ahmadis, mostly the residents of Rabwah, but enrollment is open for non-Ahmadi students from Rabwah and its surrounding areas as well.

Institute for Special Education 

Established in Nov 2013 in Rabwah, the institute runs under the domain of Nazarat Taleem, with the objective of catering to the needs of children and youth with intellectual, developmental or physical disabilities through education and therapy. The school aims to raise public awareness of the care and education available to people with special needs in the area.

Loans and scholarships 
Nazarat Taleem provides financial assistance to the talented students who cannot afford further studies. There are three types of financial aid given by this office:

Merit based scholarships 

Nazarat Taleem announces cash prizes, every year for students attaining high grades in their different levels of education, within Pakistan. These scholarships are given to the concerned students in a ceremony held every year in Rabwah.

Need based scholarships 

Students with good grades and cannot afford further studies, are provided with monthly/yearly stipends to cover the expenses of their fee structures. Application process for this scholarship is opened throughout the year.

Qarza-e-Hasana (loans) 

Nazarat Taleem has been providing to educational loans to students wanting to pursue higher studies, within or outside Pakistan.

Centenary Gold Medals 

Students who achieve positions in their universities or examination boards, are awarded with gold medals on behalf of Khalif-tul-Masih (Head of the Ahmadiyya Muslim Community)

Abdus Salam Research Forum 
Abdus Salam research forum was established in 2013 by Nazarat Taleem with the core objective to  actively promote & foster the faculties of Science and Research. Currently this forum is supporting various research projects in the domain of Environment, Community Medicine, Biophysics, Alternative Energy, Bio-statistics and Genetic Engineering.

Projects 
 Platelet indices in the cases of plasmodium vivax malaria
 Mapping of Subsurface Aquifers through resistivity Survey in Rabwah
 Detection of thin hydrocarbon reservoir sands and coal seams through spectral decomposition technique
 WBC count in probable and culture proven neonatal sepsis, and its association with mortality
 Statistical analysis of platelet indices in patients of vivax Malaria.(Collaborative project with pediatric section of Fazal-e-Omar Hospital Rabwah)
 White blood cells count and its relationship with mortality on the cases of neonatal sepsis: Statistical perspective.(Collaborative project with pediatric section of Fazal-e-Omar Hospital Rabwah)
 Microbiological and Chemical water analyses within Kirana Hill area to assess quality of drinking water.
 Study on iron deficiency and anemia in young school children and identifying possible correlating factors influencing the study
 GIS mapping of water contamination and water-related diseases in Rabwah, District Chiniot.
 Is Negative Dark Energy a Quantum Effect?
 Calculating the probability of the cosmological constant  becoming negative in causet cosmology.
 Cosmology with fluctuating dark energy — comparison with Supernovae.
 A look beyond the Baire Category Theorem.
 A study of sub compactness of Cech-Complete spaces.
 Genetic disorders & Down syndrome
 A further study of the comparison between SN1a data and causet cosmology.

International medical conferences 

Every year  Nazarat Taleem under the banner of Abdus Salam research forum and in collaboration with Fazl e Umar and Tahir heart Institute, Rabwah holds an international medical conference in Rabwah, Pakistan. Three conferences have been held so far.
 International Pediatric Conference  2014
 International Infectious Diseases Conference  2015
 International Conference on Internal Medicine and Tropical Cardiology  2016

Administration

Director 

ThKAA

Deputy Directors 
Dr.

Munr

Mnir

Ran

Qamr

References

Schools in Pakistan